Buzancy may refer to the following places in France:

 Buzancy, Aisne, a commune in the department of Aisne
 Buzancy, Ardennes, a commune in the department of Ardennes

See also
 Bar-lès-Buzancy